"Somebody Somewhere (Don't Know What He's Missin' Tonight)" is a 1976 single written by Lola Jean Dillon and recorded by Loretta Lynn.  "Somebody Somewhere (Don't Know What He's Missin' Tonight)" was Loretta Lynn's tenth number one on the country chart as a solo artist.  The single stayed at number one for two weeks and spent a total of twelve weeks on the chart.

Chart performance

References
 

Loretta Lynn songs
1976 singles
Song recordings produced by Owen Bradley
MCA Records singles
Songs written by Lola Jean Dillon